Mia Farrow is an American actress whose accolades include seven Golden Globe nominations (including one win), three BAFTA Award nominations, one National Board of Review award, and two David di Donatello Awards. In 1965, Farrow won her first Golden Globe for New Star of the Year for her performance in Guns at Batasi, and was nominated for a second Golden Globe for Best Actress in a Drama for her performance in Rosemary's Baby (1968). She would subsequently earn several Golden Globe nominations for her roles in Woody Allen films, including The Purple Rose of Cairo (1985) and Alice (1990), the latter of which earned her a National Board of Review Award for Best Actress.

Alliance of Women Film Journalists
The Alliance of Women Film Journalists is a non-profit organization founded in 2006. It is based in New York City and is dedicated to supporting work by and about women in the film industry.

British Academy Film Awards
The British Academy Film Award is an annual award show presented by the British Academy of Film and Television Arts, first held in 1947.

David di Donatello Awards
The David di Donatello Awards, founded in 1955 and named after Donatello's David, are film awards presented each year for cinematic performances and production by L'Accademia del Cinema Italiano (The Academy of Italian Cinema).

Fotogramas de Plata
The Fotogramas de Plata Awards were first awarded in 1970, succeeding the Plata de San Juan Bosco Awards, and were presented in several categories based on the Fotogramas magazine readers' votes.

Golden Globe Awards
The Golden Globe Award is an accolade bestowed by the 93 members of the Hollywood Foreign Press Association (HFPA) recognizing excellence in film and television, both domestic and foreign.

Golden Raspberry Awards
Founded in 1981, the Golden Raspberry Awards, also known as the Razzie Awards or the Razzies, is a mock prize award in recognition of the "worst in film."

Laurel Awards
The Laurel Awards were established in 1957 by the Motion Picture Exhibitor magazine to honor the best achievements in film, and were held annually until the awards' termination in 1971.

National Board of Review
The National Board of Review was founded in 1909 in New York City to award "film, domestic and foreign, as both art and entertainment".

Prism Awards
The Prism Awards are presented annually by the Entertainment Industries Council (EIC), a non-profit organization founded in 1983, in collaboration with the Substance Abuse and Mental Health Services Administration (SAMHSA), FX Network, and News Corporation. The event is held in Hollywood, and has also categories to recognize actors for their outstanding performances of substance abuse, addiction and mental illness onscreen, in television and feature films.

San Sebastián International Film Festival
The San Sebastián International Film Festival (SIFF) is an annual film festival held in Donostia-San Sebastián, Spain.

Saturn Awards
The Saturn Awards are presented annually by the Academy of Science Fiction, Fantasy and Horror Films to honor science fiction, fantasy, and horror films, television, and home video.

Critics' associations

Kansas City Film Critics Circle

Notes

References

Lists of awards received by American actor